Natanz Steel Plant ( – Mojtame`-ye Kārkhāneh Hāy Fūlād-e Naţanz) is a steel plant in Karkas Rural District, in the Central District of Natanz County, Isfahan Province, Iran. It was started in 1994 and began production in 2002.

Steelworkers strikes 
Steelworkers in Natanz held several protests inside the company in 2018 after they did not receive 10 months of salary before the Iranian New Year in March 2018. This resulted in steelworkers gathering at the factory ground and holding a demonstration. The governor of Natanz, Yusef Baferani held mediation between steelworkers and NSC. In 2018 the steelworkers' insurance was cut after payments from NSC to the insurance provider was halted. This issue received local coverage, with the Isfahan Municipality, the governor of Natanz and the parliamentary representative of Natanz expressing public sympathy for steelworkers.

Debt scandal 
In 2019 Tejarat Bank publicized a debt report in which it released the names its debtors in which several steel companies stood out. In this report, the person of Javad Tavakoli holds first place on the list with an outstanding debt of 18.07 trillion Rials or 150 million dollars. The Mobarakeh Steel Company also held debts to Tejarat Bank. MSC debts stood at 6.3 million dollars in pure debt and 17.8 million dollars in non-pure/mutual debts at a total of 24.1 million dollars.

References 

Iron and steel mills
Buildings and structures in Isfahan Province
2002 establishments in Iran
Industrial buildings in Iran